Streptomyces kanamyceticus is a bacterial species in the genus Streptomyces. It is the species from which the antibiotic kanamycin is isolated.

References

External links 
Type strain of Streptomyces kanamyceticus at BacDive -  the Bacterial Diversity Metadatabase

kanamyceticus